Haputale Railway Station is the 69th station on the Main Line. The station is located between Idalgashinna and Diyatalawa railway stations in Badulla District, Uva Province.

The station has one platform with a siding and all the trains that operate on the line stop at the station. The station opened on 19 June 1893, following the extension of the main line from Nanu Oya railway station to Haputale. In 1894 the rail line was extended from Haputale to Banderawela.

Continuity

See also
 List of railway stations in Sri Lanka
 List of railway stations by line order in Sri Lanka

References

Railway stations in Badulla District
Railway stations on the Main Line (Sri Lanka)
Railway stations opened in 1893